Larry Murphy may refer to:

Larry Murphy (criminal) (born 1966), Irish convicted rapist and suspected serial killer
Larry Murphy (actor) (born 1972), American voice actor and comedian
Larry Murphy (baseball) (1857–1911), Canadian former MLB outfielder
Larry Murphy (ice hockey) (born 1961), Canadian former NHL defenceman
Larry Murphy (hurler) (born 1972), Irish hurler
Larry Murphy, a fictional character in the 2016 musical Dear Evan Hansen

See also
Lawrence Murphy (disambiguation)